Kendriya Vidyalaya No. 2, Halwara is a public school in Halwara, Punjab, India, opened in 1983. It is located in the Air Force area in Halwara.

Annual Function 2007 
The school held their annual function at the Air Force Auditorium in 2007, featuring performances from different cultures, including Bhangra.

Sport 
Kendriya Vidyalaya No. 2 athletes have won gold medals at the national level. The Boys Kabaddi Team has won at the national level and the Girls Kabaddi Team won the second position. Some students have won gold medals in Taikwondo at the National Level. The school hosted the Regional Kabaddi Event in 2006.

External links 
School website

Schools in Ludhiana
High schools and secondary schools in Punjab, India
Schools in Punjab, India
Kendriya Vidyalayas
1983 establishments in Punjab, India
Educational institutions established in 1983
Ludhiana district